"Abracadabra" is a song by American rock group Steve Miller Band, written by Steve Miller. The song was released as the first single from the 1982 album of the same name the same year.

Origins
The song is said to have been inspired by the American singer Diana Ross, whom Miller had met when they each performed  on the same episode of the pop music television show Hullabaloo in the 1960s. The lyrics "Round and round and round it goes, where it stops nobody knows" are a reference to the spinning wheel segment from The Original Amateur Hour. Speaking on The Howard Stern Show in June 2016, Miller said at first his record company Capitol Records did not see the potential hit it would become. "Capitol didn't believe in it and didn't want to release it. I had a different deal with Phonogram in Europe. When it came out in Europe, I cancelled my American tour because it was  everywhere in the world, except the States."

Upon release, Billboard said the song "mixes sly lyric, soulful vocal, and Miller's guitar wizardry."

Commercial performance
The song became a worldwide hit, charting in ten countries and topping the charts in six. It was knocked off the top by Chicago's "Hard to Say I'm Sorry", only to return to  two weeks later. A similar occurrence happened in 1976, when "Rock'n Me" knocked Chicago's "If You Leave Me Now" out of the  spot. The song also showed substantial longevity, spending fourteen weeks in the top ten of the Hot 100 chart.

Alternate versions
The UK single version has never yet appeared on CD. It is 3:33 and is an exclusive edit where the chorus is edited back in at 3:06 and repeats to fade. The non-UK single version of the song appears in several Steve Miller Band compilation albums such as Young Hearts as well as on the Time-Life compilation Sounds of the Eighties: 1980–1982 and on a CD of songs hand-picked by Guy Fieri titled Diners, Drive-Ins and Dives: Road Songs That Rock. Capitol issued an alternative version on a promotional 12" single (Capitol Records #SPRO 9797) for radio airplay; it featured a slightly slower tempo, removal of the second verse and first chorus, and a slightly earlier fade than the LP version. A live version of the song was released on Steve Miller Band Live! in 1983.

Music video
The video features magicians in a white room performing tricks and other illusions with a female assistant. Since Miller himself was touring Europe at the time and unavailable for the shoot, he appears in the video only in a series of photos, wearing sunglasses or having his eyes covered with a black bar. The video also features an appearance by Joan Severance.

Track listings

7" 45 RPM
Side one
"Abracadabra" (single version; note: UK 7" version is an exclusive edit – see above for details)
Side two
"Baby Wanna Dance" (North American release)
"Never Say No" (European release)

12" Maxi

North American release
Side one
"Abracadabra" (album version)
Side two
"Macho City" (album version)

European release
Side one
"Abracadabra" (album version)

Side two
"Never Say No" (album version)

Chart performance

Weekly charts

Year-end charts

Decade-end charts

All-time charts

Notable cover versions
 Eagles of Death Metal covered the song on the 2019 cover album Eagles of Death Metal Presents Boots Electric Performing the Best Songs We Never Wrote.

 Filipino singer and current Journey frontman Arnel Pineda covered the song along with Whitesnake's Joel Hoekstra, Billy Sheehan, Lenny Castro, Van Romaine and Ollie Marland.

Depictions in popular media
"Abracadabra" was used in the season 12 episode "The Witches of Langley" of the animated television series American Dad! during a musical montage when Steve and his friends take up witchcraft to gain popularity at school. It was also used in the 2013 film The Incredible Burt Wonderstone. It was also played in an audition scene in the 2021 film Sing 2.

See also
List of Billboard Hot 100 number-one singles of 1982

References

1982 songs
1982 singles
Billboard Hot 100 number-one singles
Cashbox number-one singles
Number-one singles in Australia
Number-one singles in Austria
European Hot 100 Singles number-one singles
Number-one singles in Sweden
Number-one singles in Switzerland
RPM Top Singles number-one singles
Steve Miller Band songs
Songs written by Steve Miller (musician)
Capitol Records singles
Mercury Records singles
Song recordings produced by Steve Miller
Song recordings produced by Gary Mallaber